Indorama Ventures (IVL) is a producer of intermediate petrochemicals industry, the world's largest producer of PET resins, and a manufacturer of wool yarns established by Aloke Lohia in Bangkok in 1994.

History 
IVL commenced business operations in 1994 with the establishment of the first worsted wool yarn producer in Thailand.

In 1995, IVL established its first PET resin facility in Thailand.
 
It expanded into North America in 2003 by acquiring a StarPet facility, and into Europe in 2006, by establishing a PET facility under the company Orion Global.

In 2008, the company acquired Tuntex Thailand, the largest polyester fiber producer in Thailand. In 2009, merged its polyester operations into Tuntex and renamed the combined entity Indorama Polyester Industries.

IVL became a public company on September 25, 2009. As of December 31, 2014, it was owned 99.99% by Canopus International, which is owned by Aloke Lohia and his immediate family and Sri Prakash Lohia and his immediate family.

In the first half of 2011, IVL completed further acquisitions of PET plants in China, Indonesia, Mexico, Poland and the USA, and became the world’s largest PET producer.

In November 2011, it acquired the PET and Polyester fibers recycling businesses of Wellman International in Europe, and in January 2012, IVL acquired FiberVisions Holdings, a manufacturer of specialty mono and bicomponent fibers based in Duluth, Georgia, USA.

As of February 2021, IVL was the market leader in PET in the US, 
and the largest polyester fiber producer in Thailand.

Criticism

Involvement in Israeli settlements

On 12 February 2020, the United Nations published a database of all business enterprises involved in certain specified activities related to the Israeli settlements in the Occupied Palestinian Territories, including East Jerusalem, and in the occupied Golan Heights. Indorama Ventures and its subsidiary, Avgol Industries, have been listed on the database in light of their involvement in activities related to "the use of natural resources, in particular water and land, for business purposes". The international community considers Israeli settlements built on land occupied by Israel to be in violation of international law. In response to the listing, Indorama Ventures and Avgol announced that they are moving their operations outside of the West Bank.

References

Chemical companies of Thailand
Companies listed on the Stock Exchange of Thailand
Manufacturing companies based in Bangkok
Chemical companies established in 1994
Thai companies established in 1994
Lohia family